Neil Park (born 23 July 1962) is  a former Australian rules footballer who played with St Kilda in the Victorian Football League (VFL).

References

External links
 
 
		

Living people
1962 births
Australian rules footballers from Victoria (Australia)
St Kilda Football Club players